"The Rhythm" is a song by British singer MNEK. The song was released in the United Kingdom on 19 January 2015 as a digital download, as the third and final single from his debut extended play Small Talk. The song peaked at number 38 on the UK Singles Chart.

Music video
A music video to accompany the release of "The Rhythm" was first released onto YouTube on 12 February 2015 at a total length of four minutes and fifteen seconds.

Track listing

Chart performance

Weekly charts

Certifications

Release history

References

 
2015 singles
2014 songs
MNEK songs
Virgin EMI Records singles
Songs written by MNEK